The list of hoards in Asia comprises significant archaeological hoards of coins, jewellery, precious and scrap metal objects and other valuable items discovered in Asia. It includes both hoards that were buried with the intention of retrieval at a later date (personal hoards, founder's hoards, merchant's hoards, and hoards of loot), and also hoards of votive offerings which were not intended to be recovered at a later date, but excludes grave goods and single items found in isolation.

Bactrian Gold
Chausa hoard
Kfar Monash Hoard
Wonoboyo hoard
Ziwiye hoard

See also
 List of hoards in Britain
 List of hoards in the Channel Islands
 Lists of hoards

Archaeological discoveries in Asia
Asia-related lists
Treasure troves of Asia
Asia